"When You Ask About Love" is a song written by Jerry Allison and Sonny Curtis and recorded by the Crickets in 1959. It was a hit in the UK, reaching number 27 in the Singles Charts.

The Crickets version
"When You Ask About Love" was the second single from the Crickets' second album, In Style With the Crickets. It was also the second single to be released after the death of Buddy Holly. The song was written by guitarist Sonny Curtis and drummer Jerry Allison whilst they were at the home of Allison's girlfriend and future wife, Peggy Sue Gerron (after whom the Buddy Holly song is named). The B-side "Deborah" was named after Peggy Sue's younger niece.

Personnel
 Earl Sinks - vocals
 Sonny Curtis - guitar
 Joe B. Mauldin - bass
 Jerry Allison - drums
 Dudley Brooks - piano

Charts

Matchbox version

In 1980, English rockabilly band Matchbox released a cover of the song as the second single from for their fourth album Midnite Dynamos. It was the band's biggest hit, reaching number 4 on the UK Singles Chart.

Reception
Reviewing the song in Record Mirror, Mike Nicholls described the song as "pukeabilly – uninspired, backward looking and unoriginal – surely we've got past this by now. If you want this sort of "music" – go back and listen to Buddy Holly, at least he had some conviction."

Charts

Other recordings
 In 1962, Julie Grant covered the song for the B-side of "Up on the Roof".
 In 1965, Billy J. Kramer with The Dakotas covered the song, for their US album Trains and Boats and Planes.
 In 1965, Mancunian Johnny Peters covered the song as a single, but it failed to chart.
 In 1980, Swedish band Sven-Erics covered the song for their album Santa Maria.
 In 1998, a cover by Mike Berry & The Outlaws was featured on the album Rock 'n' Roll Daze.

References

1959 songs
1959 singles
1980 songs
1980 singles
Songs written by Jerry Allison
Songs written by Sonny Curtis
Song recordings produced by Norman Petty
Brunswick Records singles
Coral Records singles
Song recordings produced by Peter Collins (record producer)
Magnet Records singles
The Crickets songs